Gerrit de Graeff, vrijheer van Zuid-Polsbroek (24 February 1766, Amsterdam – 16 December 1814) was a member of the influential De Graeff family of Amsterdam. He belonged to the patrician class of the city and held the feudal titles Free Lord of Zuid-Polsbroek as those of Purmerland and Ilpendam.

Biography
De Graeff was a son of Gerrit de Graeff (II) van Zuid-Polsbroek, patricier of Amsterdam, and Christina van Herzeele. In 1794 he was married to Emilia Henriette Stadlander (1766–1826). They couple had four children: 
 Christina Elisabeth de Graeff (born 1795), who married Jacob Gerrit van Garderen (1803–1856), and lives at castle Ilpenstein
 Gerrit de Graeff (IV) van Zuid-Polsbroek (1797–1870), who married Carolina Ursulina Stephania Engels (1795–1864)
 Anna Margaretha de Graeff (1798–1824)
 Cornelia Maria de Graeff (1800–1876)

The family lived at Herengracht in a mansion now the Tassenmuseum Hendrikje. Most of the time he resided at his castle Ilpenstein, and he also owned the country estate Bronstee  near Heemstede. At Ilpenstein De Graeff has owned a big art collection, including paintings from Rembrandt van Rijn, Gerard Ter Borch and Jacob van Ruisdael. The collection some very famous pictures like Catharina Hooft with her Nurse, painted by Frans Hals, and the Pickenoys representative Marriage portraits from Cornelis de Graeff and Catharina Hooft. Both are seen  now at the Gemäldegalerie, Berlin.

De Graeffs free and high Fief Zuid-Polsbroek
Zuid-Polsbroek was an allodium and a vrije en hoge heerlijkheid ("free and high Lordship"), a type of local jurisdiction with many rights. Since 1610 the vrije en hooghe heerlijkheid was a possession of his family. As a "free an high Lordship", Zuid-Polsbroek was an independent (semisouverain Lordship) of the provinces Holland or Utrecht.

Since 1155 the lords of Polsbroek were able to speak the high (blood court) middle and low justice over their territory. Zuid-Polsbroek was a half-independent (semi-sovereign) entity of the provinces Holland or Utrecht, like the larger Barony of IJsselstein to the east. During the late middle ages it became unsure if Zuid-Polsbroek belonged to the States of Holland or to the province (unie) of Utrecht. Polsbroek paid their duties to the States of Holland.   But in 1795, when the French introduced the municipal system in the Netherlands, the rights of the heerlijkheid were largely abolished, although the heerlijkheid itself existed until the early 20th century. Afterwards Zuid-Polsbroek became a separate municipality in the province of Utrecht.

Gerrit de Graeff van Zuid-Polsbroek died only three years after his father at his citypalace at Amsterdam. His only son Gerrit succeeded him as Free Lord of Zuid-Polsbroek in 1814.

Noble titles

Notes

Literature
 Graeff, P. de (P. de Graeff Gerritsz en Dirk de Graeff van Polsbroek) Genealogie van de familie De Graeff van Polsbroek, Amsterdam 1882.
 Bruijn, J. H. de Genealogie van het geslacht De Graeff van Polsbroek 1529/1827, met bijlagen. De Bilt 1962-63.
 Moelker, H.P. De heerlijkheid Purmerland en Ilpendam (1978 Purmerend)

Gerrit (III.) van Zuid-Polsbroek, Graeff de
Nobility from Amsterdam
Lords of Zuid-Polsbroek
Lords of Purmerland and Ilpendam
1766 births
1814 deaths